Norbert Hofmann may refer to:

 Norbert Hofmann (footballer, born 1951), German footballer
 Norbert Hofmann (footballer, born 1972), German footballer
 Norbert Hofmann (sport shooter) (born 1963), German sports shooter